Scott Mason is an American author, reporter for WRAL-TV and host of the Southeast Emmy award-winning Tarheel Traveler since 2007.  Mason authored Tar Heel Traveler Eats: Food Journeys across North Carolina in 2014. and Tar heel traveler : journeys across North Carolina. in 2013.

Before joining WRAL, he served as news director at WCVE-TV, Richmond, Va. from 1988 to 1990 where his Virginia Currents documentary series won more than 100 awards for journalistic excellence catching the attention of WRAL.   He was news bureau chief at WHIO-TV in Dayton, Ohio from 1986 to 1988, a reporter at WXII-TV in Winston-Salem, N.C. from 1984 to 1985 and a reporter at WTVC-TV in Chattanooga, Tennessee.

Scott’s success caught the attention of WRAL-TV, the CBS affiliate in Raleigh, North Carolina. In April, 1997, Scott became the station’s Documentary Producer. He researched, wrote, and produced nine documentaries before adding his talents to the nightly news team as a reporter specializing in features.
 
Mason is a 1984 graduation of Washington and Lee University where he majored in Journalism and Communications. He is currently pursuing his master's degree in creative writing at Queens University of Charlotte. He lives in Raleigh with his wife Nina, daughters Lane and Genie, and son Scout.

Awards
 Southeast Emmy Awards
 2000 Documentary The Cape Light 14 2/5/2000
 2001  Public Affairs Upon This Rock
 2003  News Series / Hard News Pentagon Stories
 2006  Writer/News Stories
 2009  Light Feature News Report Devil's Tramping Ground 2009  Magazine Program Tar Heel Traveler 2009  Serious Feature News Report Marty 2009  Writer/News Scott Mason Composite
 2010  Magazine Series Tar Heel Traveler #8 2012  Light Feature News Report Birthday Card 2013  News Writing
 2014  Light Feature News Series Tar Heel Traveler New Year's Eve Drops 2014  Magazine Program Tar Heel Traveler''
 Edward R. Murrow Award
 2015  Writing 
 North Carolina Television Reporter of the Year
 2004  
 2005

References

External links
 Tar Heel Traveler

Year of birth missing (living people)
Living people
American male journalists
Washington and Lee University alumni
21st-century American journalists